The M243 smoke grenade launcher uses rounds filled with red phosphorus. The cloud lasts 1 to 3 minutes depending on wind speed and other weather conditions.

See also
Ground Mobility Vehicle – (US)SOCOM program - American Special Operations Humvees that can install M243s.

Sources
M243 (NSN 1040-01-059-0560), M257 (NSN 1040-01-070-1213), M259 (NSN 1040-01-107-7501) Smoke Grenade Launchers

Grenade launchers of the United States